Nimshong is a Village in Zhemgang District in southeastern-central Bhutan.

References

Populated places in Bhutan